Wood grain is the longitudinal arrangement of wood fibers or the pattern resulting from such an arrangement.

Definition and meanings
R. Bruce Hoadley wrote that grain is a "confusingly versatile term" with numerous different uses, including the direction of the wood cells (e.g., straight grain, spiral grain), surface appearance or figure, growth-ring placement (e.g., vertical grain), plane of the cut (e.g., end grain), rate of growth (e.g., narrow grain), and relative cell size (e.g., open grain).

Physical aspects
Perhaps the most important physical aspect of wood grain in woodworking is the grain direction or slope (e.g. against the grain). The two basic categories of grain are straight and cross grain. Straight grain runs parallel to the longitudinal axis of the piece. Cross grain deviates from the longitudinal axis in two ways: spiral grain or diagonal grain. The amount of deviation is called the slope of the grain.

In describing the application of a woodworking technique to a given piece of wood, the direction of the technique may be:
 with the grain (easy; giving a clean result)
 against the grain (heavy going; giving a poor result such as chipping or tear-out)
 across the grain (direction of cut is across the grain lines, but the plane of the cut is still aligned with them)
 end grain (at right angles to the grain, for example trimming the end of a plank)

Grain alignment must be considered when joining pieces of wood, or designing wooden structures. For example, a stressed span is less likely to fail if tension is applied along the grain, rather than across the grain. Grain direction will also affect the type of warping seen in the finished item.

In describing the alignment of the wood in the tree a distinction may be made. Different tree species may have one of the following basic grain descriptions and types: 
 straight - grain which runs in a single direction, parallel to the axis of the tree. Woods with this grains are the easiest to work.
 spiral - grain which spirals around the axis of the tree.
 interlocked - grain which spirals around the axis of the tree, but reverses its direction for periods of years resulting in alternating directions of the spiral grain. On quartersawn surfaces the change in grain direction creates a ribbon stripe figure. These are the most difficult to work.
 wavy - grain which grows in a wavy fashion up the trunk; seen best in flatsawn sections of wood.
 irregular - grain that swirls or twists. It can be found in a number of different patterns. This can be caused by factors such as knots, burls or "crotch" wood - where large branches separate from the trunk.

Aesthetic aspects
In its simplest aesthetic meaning, wood grain is the alternating regions of relatively darker and lighter wood resulting from the differing growth parameters occurring in different seasons (i.e., growth rings) on a cut or split piece of wood.

Causes including fungus, burls, stress, knots, special grain alignments, and others produce figure in wood. Their rarity often promotes the value of both the raw material, and the finished work it becomes a part of. These include:

 bird's eye
 quilted
 fiddleback
 curly

The way a given piece of wood has been sawn affects both its appearance and physical properties:
 flat-grain: flat-sawn, slab-sawn, plain sawn, bastard-sawn, or sawn "through and through".
 edge grain: quarter-sawn or rift-sawn or straight-grained, and
 end grain: the grain of wood seen when it is cut across the growth rings.

Strictly speaking, grain is not always the same as the figure of wood.

There is irregular grain in burr wood or burl wood, but this is result of very many knots.

See also
 Grain painting
 Grain filler
 Knee (construction)
 Wood finishing

References

Grain
Grain
Wood